The Staniukovich Formation is a geologic formation in Alaska. It preserves fossils dating back to the Cretaceous period.

See also

 List of fossiliferous stratigraphic units in Alaska
 Paleontology in Alaska

References
 

Geologic formations of Alaska
Cretaceous System of North America